Pundt is a surname. Notable people with this surname include:

 Hermann Pundt (1928–2000), American architect
 Lockett Pundt (born 1982), American musician

See also
 Punt (surname)